Present Tense is an album by saxophonist James Carter released on the EmArcy label in 2008.

Reception

In the AllMusic review, Thom Jurek commented: "Present Tense showcases Carter at his most disciplined and ambitious ... This may be Carter's finest album because of its insistence on the balance between restraint and adventure". In JazzTimes, David R. Adler called the album "an unselfconscious mix of influences, more three-dimensional than his various tribute discs and the recent organ-trio blowouts". On All About Jazz Greg Camphire observed: "This solid, straight-ahead outing sounds both "old-timey" (in the best sense), with deep roots in blues and swing; and exploratory, never sacrificing Carter's personal approach, while maintaining his place in the jazz tradition". In The Guardian, critic John Fordham wrote: "The whole set is a jazz history, rescued from cheesiness by Carter's mastery of every technical detail".

Track listing
All compositions by James Carter, except where indicated.
 "Rapid Shave" (Dave Burns) - 7:28
 "Bro. Dolphy" - 7:13
 "Pour Que Ma Vie Demeure" (Django Reinhardt) - 5:05
 "Sussa Nita" - 6:00
 "Song of Delilah" (Victor Young, Ray Evans, Jay Livingston) - 5:11
 "Dodo's Bounce" (Dodo Marmarosa) - 6:00
 "Shadowy Sands" (Jimmy Jones) - 8:28
 "Hymn of the Orient" (Gigi Gryce) - 4:23
 "Bossa J.C." - 4:41
 "Tenderly" (Walter Gross, Jack Lawrence) - 8:12

Personnel
James Carter - flute, bass clarinet, soprano saxophone, tenor saxophone, baritone saxophone
Dwight Adams - trumpet, flugelhorn
D. D. Jackson - piano
Rodney Jones - guitar (tracks 4, 6 & 9)
James Genus - bass
Victor Lewis - drums
Eli Fountain - congas, percussion (tracks 4, 7 & 9)

References 

2008 albums
James Carter (musician) albums
EmArcy Records albums
Albums produced by Michael Cuscuna